The Malta Classic Car Museum is a museum on the island state of Malta.

References

External links

Classic Car Museum
Automotive museums
Buildings and structures in St. Paul's Bay